The 2015–16 Championnat de France amateur 2 is the 18th season of the fifth tier in the French football league system in its current format. The competition is contested by 112 clubs split geographically across 8 groups of 14 teams each. The teams include amateur clubs (although a few are semi-professional) and the reserve teams of professional clubs.

Teams
22 teams were promoted as champions of the Division d'Honneur of the regional leagues. 12 teams were due to be relegated from the CFA, however two were eventually reprieved due to demotions or resignations of other teams. 7 teams due to be relegated to the regional leagues were also reprieved.

On 30 May 2015, Le Poíre-sur-Vie VF resigned from the National division, and took the place of their reserve team in CFA2, with the reserve team being relegated to the regional league.

On 5 June 2015, US Colomiers were placed in CFA2, following their relegation from the National, due to an administrative failure regarding the registration of an amateur player. However, this decision was overturned by appeal on 15 July 2015.

On 30 June 2015, CSO Amnéville requested relegation to the regional league.

Eligibility for Promotion
The reserve teams in CFA2 cannot obtain promotion if their centre de formation (equivalent to Academy) is deemed of insufficient quality. The following teams are not eligible for promotion from CFA2 this season:

Group A
 Brest (res)
Group C
 Niort (res) 
Group D
 Bastia (res) 
 Évian TG (res)
 Nîmes (res) 
Group E
 Clermont (res)
 Dijon (res)
Group F
 Strasbourg (res) 
Group G
 Amiens (res)
 Boulogne (res)
Group H
 AC Ajaccio (res) 
 Paris FC (res)

League tables

Season outcomes
Outcomes below are provisional and subject to ratification by the FFF.

Champions and promotion
Rennes reserves, Chartres, ES Paulhan-Pézenas, Andrézieux, Reims reserves, Lille reserves and Le Havre reserves are promoted to CFA as champions of their respective groups.

Toulon, champions of Group D, are set to merge for next season with Toulon-Le Las, forming Sporting Club Toulon. The new club will play in CFA, with their reserves taking the place in CFA2. Accordingly, Annecy are promoted to CFA from Group D as best placed team.

Lusitanos St-Maur, Montpellier reserves, Raon-l'Étape and Granville are promoted, due to having the best record of the 2nd placed clubs against the top five teams eligible for promotion in their respective groups.

Reims reserves are Champions of 2015–16 Championnat de France Amateur 2, due to having the best record of the four promoted sides against the teams finishing in 2nd to 6th in their respective groups.

Relegation
Saint-Lô, Pontivy, Challans, Châteauroux reserves, Villenave, Blagnac, Aix-les-Bains, Sens, Thiers, Thaon, Épernay, Valenciennes reserves, Aulnoye, Gonfreville and ASPTT Caen are relegated to their regional Division d'Honneur as a result of finishing 13th or 14th in their respective groups.

Poiré-sur-Vie, Lannion, Tourcoing, Aubagne and Angoulême are relegated to their regional Division d'Honneur, due to having the worst record of the 12th placed teams against the teams finishing in 7th to 11th in their respective groups.

Reprieves
On 8 June, the FFF confirmed that Luçon would be administratively relegated from 2015–16 Championnat National to the regional Division d'Honneur. This resulted in a reprieve for Angoulême.

On 31 May, the FFF confirmed that Colmar would be administratively relegated, in addition to their sporting relegation from 2015–16 Championnat National. Colmar subsequently filed for bankruptcy, and will reform in the regional Division d'Honneur. This results in a reprieve for Aubagne.

On 21 June, it was confirmed that Moulins would be administratively relegated to the regional Division d'Honneur due to bankruptcy. This resulted in a reprieve for Tourcoing. Moulins eventually completed a merger with Yzeure, forming Moulins Yzeure Foot 03.

On 10 June, it was confirmed that Châtellerault would be administratively relegated to the regional Division d'Honneur due to financial issues. This resulted in a reprieve for Lannion.

If any administrative events lead to teams from outside the relegation places being relegated, already relegated teams will be reprieved in the following order:

4th to 8th Best 12th Placed teams
Based on record against the teams finishing in 7th to 11th place in their respective groups.

Best 13th Placed teams
Based on record against the teams finishing in 8th to 12th place in their respective groups.

Top scorers

References

External links 
 Official site
 Standings and statistics

2015
5
Fra